This is a global list of largest technology companies by revenue, according to the Fortune Global 500. It shows companies identified by Fortune as being in the technology sector, ranked by total annual revenue. Other metrics not shown here, in particular market capitalization, are often used alternatively to define the size of a company.

The list includes companies whose primary business activities are associated with the technology industry, which includes computer hardware, software, electronics, semiconductors,  telecom equipment, e-commerce and computer services. Note: This list shows only companies with annual revenues exceeding US$50 billion.

Legend

2021 list 
Companies are ranked by total revenues for their respective fiscal years ended on or before March 31, 2021. All data in the table is taken from the Fortune Global 500 list of technology sector companies for 2021 unless otherwise specified.

As of 2021, Fortune lists Amazon (revenue of $386.064 billion) in the retailing sector rather than the technology sector. Similarly, Jingdong ($108.087 billion) and Alibaba ($105.865 billion) are also listed in the retailing sector.

2020 list 
Companies are ranked by total revenues for their respective fiscal years ended on or before March 31, 2020. All data in the table is taken from the Fortune Global 500 list of technology sector companies for 2020 unless otherwise specified.

As of 2020, Fortune lists Amazon (revenue of $280.522 billion) in the retailing sector rather than the technology sector.

2019 list 
Companies are ranked by total revenues for their respective fiscal years ended on or before March 31, 2019. All data in the table is taken from the Fortune Global 500 list of technology sector companies for 2019 unless otherwise specified.

As of 2019, Fortune lists Amazon (revenue of $232.887 billion) in the retailing sector rather than the technology sector.

2018 list 
Ranked by total revenues for respective fiscal years ended on or before March 31, 2018.

See also 
 List of largest Internet companies
 List of the largest software companies
 List of largest manufacturing companies by revenue
 List of largest companies by revenue
 List of largest United States–based employers globally
 List of largest employers

References

External links 
 Fortune Global 500

Technology Companies
Economy-related lists of superlatives
Revenue